Argyrotaenia kimballi, Kimball's leafroller moth, is a species of moth of the family Tortricidae. It is found in the United States, where it has been recorded from Alabama, Florida, Louisiana, Maryland, Mississippi, North Carolina, South Carolina, Tennessee and Texas.

The wingspan is about 16–20 mm. The ground color of forewings are silky cream-white, with grayish transverse striation. The hindwings are cream-white, suffused with gray. Adults have been recorded on wing year round.

The larvae feed on Citrus species.

References

K
Moths of North America
Moths described in 1961